Local government elections took place in London, and some other parts of the United Kingdom on Thursday 3 May 1990.

All London borough council seats were up for election.  The previous Borough elections in London were in 1986.

The elections saw a poor result for the recently formed Liberal Democrats, with the party losing 10% of its vote and 20 council seats. This decline was accompanied by success for the Conservatives, who gained 46 councillors and 1 council, while Labour lost 32 council seats and 1 council. The Green Party, fresh from winning 15% of the vote in the European elections one year previously, achieved a record vote share of 6% but elected no councillors. The party would not exceed this result again until 2006.

Results summary

Turnout: 2,383,990 voters cast ballots, a turnout of 48.2% (+2.7%).

Council results

Borough result maps

References

 
May 1990 events in the United Kingdom
1990